Neocnemis is a genus of beetles belonging to the family Curculionidae.

Species:
 Neocnemis occidentalis Crotch, 1867

References

Curculionidae
Curculionidae genera